In organic chemistry, an acetonide is the functional group composed of the cyclic ketal of a diol with acetone. The more systematic name for this structure is an isopropylidene ketal. Acetonide is a common protecting group for 1,2- and 1,3-diols. The protecting group can be removed by hydrolysis of the ketal using dilute aqueous acid.

Example
The acetonides of small di- and triols, as well as many sugars and sugar alcohols, are common. The hexaol mannitol reacts with 2,2-dimethoxypropane to give the bis-acetonide, which oxidizes to give the acetonide of glyceraldehyde:

(CHOHCHOHCH2OH)2 + 2 (MeO)2CMe2 → (CHOHCHCH2O2CMe2)2 + 4 MeOH
(CHOHCHOCH2OCMe2)2 + [O] → 2 OCHCHCH2O2CMe2 + H2O

An example of its use as a protecting group in a complex organic synthesis is the Nicolaou Taxol total synthesis. It is a common protecting group for sugars and sugar alcohols, a simple example being solketal.

The acetonides of corticosteroid are used in dermatology, because their increased lipophilicity leads to better penetration into the skin.

 Fluclorolone acetonide
 Fluocinolone acetonide
 Triamcinolone acetonide

See also
 Acetophenide
 Acroleinide
 Aminobenzal
 Cyclopentanonide
 Pentanonide

References